Jason Adam McDonald (born March 20, 1972), is an American former professional baseball player who played in Major League Baseball (MLB) primarily as an outfielder for the Oakland Athletics and Texas Rangers from 1997 to 2000.  

McDonald attended Sacramento City College and the University of Houston. In 1993 he played collegiate summer baseball with the Cotuit Kettleers of the Cape Cod Baseball League. He was selected by Oakland in the 4th round of the 1993 MLB Draft.

References

External links

1972 births
Living people
American expatriate baseball players in Canada
Baseball players from California
Camden Riversharks players
Chico Heat players
Cotuit Kettleers players
Edmonton Trappers players
Gulf Coast Rangers players
Houston Cougars baseball players
Huntsville Stars players
Major League Baseball outfielders
Modesto A's players
Oakland Athletics players
Oklahoma RedHawks players
Charlotte Rangers players
Sacramento City Panthers baseball players
Southern Oregon A's players
Sportspeople from Modesto, California
West Michigan Whitecaps players
Texas Rangers players
Vancouver Canadians players